Kharzar may refer to:
 Khar Zar, Afghanistan
 Kharzar, Lorestan, Iran
 Kharzar, Fariman, Razavi Khorasan Province, Iran
 Kharzar, Mashhad, Razavi Khorasan Province, Iran